Vydubychi Monastery ( Vydubyts'kyi monastyr) is an historic monastery in the Ukrainian capital Kyiv. During the Soviet period it housed the NANU Institute of Archaeology.

History 

The monastery was established between 1070 and 1077 by Vsevolod, son of Yaroslav the Wise. It was a family cloister of Vsevolod's son Vladimir Monomakh and his descendants.

The monastery, and the neighbourhood in present-day Kyiv where it is located, was named after an old Slavic legend about the pagan god Perun and the Grand Prince Vladimir the Great of Kyiv. The word "Vydubychi" comes from the word Vydobychi → Vydobych → Vydobech which means "to swim up", "emerge from water".

The legend has it that Vladimir ordered the wooden figures of Perun (the Thunder God) and other pagan gods dumped into the Dnieper River during the mass Baptism of Kyiv. The disheartened Kyivans, though accepting the baptism, ran along the Dnieper River calling for the old gods to emerge from water (Перуне выдуби!). Accordingly, the area down the river stream where Perun emerged was named Vydubichu or Vydubychi in modern Ukrainian.

The monastery operated the ferry across the Dnieper River and many of the best scholars of that time lived and worked there. Among them, chroniclers Sylvestr of Kiev and Moisey made a great contribution to writing the Tale of Bygone Years.

From the 1596 Union of Brest the Monastery was an official seat of the first three metropolitans of the Greek Catholic Church in Ukraine - Mykhajlo Rohoza, Ipatii Potii and Yosyf Rutskyi. In 1635 it was returned to the Ukrainian Orthodox Church.

The monastery was continuously protected by Ukraine's hetmans and aristocratic families. Hetman Ivan Mazepa in 1695 forbade the Vydubytskyi Monastery's neighbors to "do injustice to the monastery" and placed it under the guard of Starodub Regiment Col. Mykhailo Myklashevskyi, who established the Baroque-style Church of St. George and new Transfiguration Refectory. Hetman Danylo Apostol subsidised construction of the monastery's bell tower. In the 18th century the help of Hetman Kyrylo Rozumovsky's ensured the new properties for the Vydubychi.

Since the late 1990s, the monastery is administered by the Ukrainian Orthodox Church - Kyiv Patriarchate. The Vydubychi Church Choir was among the first choirs in newly independent Ukraine to reinstate singing of the Divine Liturgy in the Ukrainian language.

Buildings and structures 

Only a few churches of this monastery have survived over the centuries. One of these is the Collegiate Church of Saint Michael, which was built on behest of Vsevolod I and partly reconstructed between 1766 and 1769 by Russian architect M. I. Yurasov. The Ukrainian baroque structures include the magnificent 5-domed St. George Cathedral, Transfiguration of the Saviour Church and refectory, all dating from 1696-1701. A belltower, commissioned by the Hetman Danylo Apostol, was erected in 1727-33 and built up in 1827-31.

 Saint Michael Church
 Saint George Cathedral
 Refectory with Savior-Transfiguraton Church
 Chapel of the Saint Michael Church
 Fraternity building
 Building of the abbot
 Necropolis

Necropolis 

Many distinguished individuals are buried there, including:

 Y. Handzyuk - Commander of the First Ukrainian Corps (1918), executed by the Bolsheviks
 Bogdan Khanenko (1848–1917) - collector and patron of the arts, his collection was moved to the Kyiv Museum of Art and Industry after his death
 Konstantin Ushinsky (1823–1871) - pedagogue, advocate of teaching in Ukrainian (which was prohibited in the Russian Empire in the second half of the 19th century according to the Ems Ukase.)
 Vladimir Alekseyevich Betz (1834–1896) - anatomist famous for his discovery of giant pyramidal motoneurons which are now called Betz cells.
 Lev Mikhailovich Yashvil (1768–1836) - artillery general during the Napoleonic Wars.

Vydubychi Monastery in Art and Literatury 
 Drawing, Vydubytskyi Monastery in Kyiv (1844) by Taras Shevchenko. The work is located in the National Art Museum of Ukraine, Kyiv.
 Drawing, Vydubytskyi Monastery (1840s) by Mykhailo Sazhyn. The work is located in the National Art Museum of Ukraine, Kyiv.

See also 

 Trinity Monastery, Kyiv - formerly a filial monastery of Vydubychi

References 

 Vydubitskiy Monastery 
 Necropolis of the monastery

External links 

 Vydubychi Monastery
 Official site of the Vydubychi Church Choir

 
Buildings and structures in Kyiv
Tourist attractions in Kyiv
Religious buildings and structures in Kyiv
Monasteries of the Orthodox Church of Ukraine
Christian monasteries established in the 11th century
Churches of the Orthodox Church of Ukraine
Church buildings with domes
Baroque architecture in Ukraine
Pecherskyi District
Architectural monuments of Ukraine of national importance in Kyiv